Ochrosia is a genus of flowering plants, first described in 1789. It is in the family Apocynaceae, native to Southeast Asia, Australia, and various islands of the Indian and Pacific Oceans.

Species
 Ochrosia ackeringae  – Indonesia, Philippines, Papuasia, Christmas Island
 Ochrosia acuminata Trimen ex Valeton – Sulawesi
 Ochrosia alyxioides Guillaumin – Vanuatu
 Ochrosia apoensis Elmer – Luzon, Mindanao
 Ochrosia balansae (Guillaumin) Baill. ex Guillaumin – New Caledonia
 Ochrosia basistamina Hendrian – Sulawesi
 Ochrosia bodenheimarum Guillaumin – Vallée de la Toutouta in New Caledonia
 Ochrosia borbonica  – Mauritius + Réunion; naturalized in Guangdong 
 Ochrosia brevituba Boiteau – New Caledonia
 Ochrosia brownii (Fosberg & Sachet) Lorence & Butaud – Nuku Hiva in Marquesas (extinct in the wild) 
 Ochrosia citrodora K.Schum. & Lauterb. – New Guinea
 Ochrosia coccinea (Teijsm. & Binn.) Miq. – Maluku, Sulawesi, New Guinea, Solomon Islands; naturalized in Guangdong 
 Ochrosia compta , Hōlei – Hawaii (Maui, Oahu, Molokai)
 Ochrosia elliptica  – Lord Howe Island, Queensland, New Caledonia, Vanuatu, Nauru; naturalized in Guangdong + Taiwan 
 Ochrosia fatuhivensis  –  Fatu Hiva in Marquesas but extinct
 Ochrosia ficifolia (S.Moore) Markgr. – New Guinea
 Ochrosia glomerata  – Borneo, Sulawesi, Philippines, Maluku, New Guinea, Solomon Islands 
 Ochrosia grandiflora  – New Caledonia
 Ochrosia haleakalae , Hōlei – Maui + island of Hawaii (so-called Big Island) in Hawaiian Islands
 Ochrosia hexandra Koidz. – Kazan-retto ( = Volcano Islands of Japan)
 Ochrosia inventorum L.Allorge – New Caledonia
 Ochrosia iwasakiana (Koidz.) Koidz. ex Masam. ( = Ryukyu Islands of Japan)
 Ochrosia kauaiensis , Hōlei – Kauai in Hawaiian Islands
 †Ochrosia kilaueaensis , Hōlei – island of Hawaii (so-called Big Island) in Hawaiian Islands, but extinct
 Ochrosia kilneri F.Muell. – Queensland
 Ochrosia lifuana Guillaumin – Loyalty Islands + Isle of Pines in New Caledonia
 Ochrosia mariannensis A.DC. – Mariana Islands
 Ochrosia miana Baill. ex Guillaumin – New Caledonia
 Ochrosia minima  – Queensland, Papua New Guinea
 Ochrosia moorei  – Queensland, New South Wales
 Ochrosia mulsantii Montrouz. – New Caledonia
 Ochrosia nakaiana (Koidz.) Koidz. ex H.Hara – Ogasawara-shoto ( = Bonin Islands of Japan)
 Ochrosia newelliana F.M.Bailey – Queensland
 Ochrosia novocaledonica Däniker – New Caledonia
 Ochrosia oppositifolia  – Seychelles, Chagos Islands, Sri Lanka, Maldive Islands, Andaman & Nicobar Islands, Thailand, Vietnam, W Malaysia, Indonesia, Papuasia, Samoa, Tonga, Tuvalu, Vanuatu, Wallis & Futuna, French Polynesia, Line Islands, Micronesia
 Ochrosia poweri F.M.Bailey – Queensland, New South Wales
 Ochrosia sciadophylla Markgr – Bismarck Archipelago, Solomon Islands
 Ochrosia sevenetii Boiteau – New Guinea
 Ochrosia silvatica Däniker – New Caledonia
 Ochrosia solomonensis (Merr. & L.M.Perry) Fosberg & Boiteau – Solomon Islands
 Ochrosia syncarpa Markgr. – Bali, Lombok, Timor, Flores
 Ochrosia tahitensis  – Tahiti 
 Ochrosia tenimberensis Markgr. – Tanimbar Islands

formerly included
 Ochrosia nukuhivensis  = Rauvolfia nukuhivensis (Fosberg & Sachet) Lorence & Butaud
 Ochrosia sandwicensis A.DC. = Rauvolfia sandwicensis A.DC. 
 Ochrosia tuberculata (Vahl) Pichon = Rauvolfia sandwicensis A.DC.

References

External links

 
Apocynaceae genera
Taxonomy articles created by Polbot